The 1995 PBA Governors Cup Finals was the best-of-7 championship series of the 1995 PBA Governors Cup and the conclusion of the conference's playoffs. The San Miguel Beermen and the Alaska Milkmen played for the 62nd championship contested by the league.

The Alaska Milkmen retains the Governor's Cup title and ending frustrations of two bridesmaid finishes during the season, defeating the San Miguel Beermen in a seven-game series, winning the last two games.

Qualification

Series scoring summary

Games summary

Game 1

Alaska outscored San Miguel, 25 to 13 in the final period. Allan Caidic buried his only triple for the game to move the Beermen ahead, 75–69, but the Milkmen countered with a 10–0 run to put them on top, 79–75. Sean Chambers led Alaska with 25 points and his defense on Caidic held the triggerman to just five points on a 2-of-9 shooting.

Game 2

Paul Alvarez teamed up with Gido Babilonia in a crucial 7–2 run that snapped the final 88-all tie. Alvarez led the Beermen's rally from nine points down in the third quarter. Alaska scored just 12 points in the fourth quarter as Sean Chambers was held scoreless by the hustling San Miguel defense.

Game 3

Alaska exploited every fumble, error and missed San Miguel committed in the third quarter to fuel a breakaway and rout the Beermen. The Milkmen led by as many as 34 points midway in the fourth quarter.

Game 4

Allan Caidic played his best game of the series, poured in 28 points and fired three of his six three-pointers in the third period, a short jumper by Paul Alvarez gave the Beermen its biggest lead, 99–84 with 7:33 remaining.

Game 5

Kenny Travis scored nine of his 48 points in the second overtime, Travis snapped the final tie at 110-all with his seventh triple with 1:07 left and gave San Miguel the lead for good. The Beermen missed two chances of putting away the Milkmen in regulation and the first extra period. Sean Chambers follow up on Abarrientos layup with 8.7 seconds left in regulation tied the game at 94-all, Jojo Lastimosa's triple with 31 seconds left in the first overtime tied it again at 103-all.

Game 6

Alaska rallied from 16 points down in the first half and from a 41–53 halftime deficit. The Milkmen outscored the Beermen, 28–10 in the third quarter to take a 69–63 lead going into the final 12 minutes. Jojo Lastimosa and Jeffrey Cariaso combined for 13 points that broke a 74-all deadlock and gave the Milkmen their biggest lead, 90–79, with time down to 1:37.

Game 7

Alaska trailed by four points, the last at 75–79 with eight minutes to go in the final quarter when they held the Beermen to a single free throw for five minutes to put the game away, Jojo Lastimosa bury a triple as the Milkmen regain the upper hand at 80–79, jumpers from the right flank by Bong Hawkins and Johnny Abarrientos gave Alaska an 89–80 lead with 1:36 left.

Rosters

Broadcast notes

References

External links
PBA official website

1995 PBA season
1995
San Miguel Beermen games
Alaska Aces (PBA) games
PBA Governors' Cup Finals